Boniswil railway station is a railway station in the municipality of Boniswil, in the Swiss canton of Aargau. It is an intermediate stop on the standard gauge Seetal line of Swiss Federal Railways.

Services 
The following services stop at Boniswil:

References

External links 
 
 

Railway stations in the canton of Aargau
Swiss Federal Railways stations